Amala is the debut studio album by American singer and rapper Doja Cat. It was released on March 30, 2018, by Kemosabe Records and RCA Records. The album's deluxe version was released on March 1, 2019, and featured her breakthrough singles "Juicy", "Tia Tamera", and "Mooo!". Her first commercial release in four years, Doja Cat has expressed strong disdain toward the record for a number of reasons.

Upon its release, Amala was initially a commercial failure and was largely ignored by critics. In August 2018, the album and Doja Cat gained attention when her novelty song "Mooo!" became an internet meme. As a result, songs "Candy" and "Juicy" became sleeper hits, and the album debuted on the Billboard 200 chart in August 2019. Amala would eventually peak at number 138 on the chart in November 2019, coinciding with the release of her second studio album, Hot Pink.

Background and release
On March 27, 2018, Doja Cat's label announced the album via Twitter. In addition to announcing the release date of the album, they also revealed the title of the project and its cover. When "Roll With Us" was released in February 2018 as the first promotional single, the album was originally titled Baby. Amala was later repackaged with a deluxe version on March 1, 2019, which added three new songs: "Juicy", "Tia Tamera", and "Mooo!".

Doja Cat herself has expressed strong disdain toward the record, claiming that it does not entirely represent her as an artist. She has also stated that she believes it is not a "finished album", partially due to her constantly partying and being high on marijuana during its recording. Her first commercial release in four years, she revealed that it was also rushed in order to meet deadlines, and that it was made in a "difficult time" as she received "almost no support" before its release.

Singles
"Roll With Us" was released as the album's sole promotional single on February 1, 2018, and entered the Spotify's Global Viral 50 chart upon release. The album's lead single, titled "Go To Town", was released on March 9, 2018, along with a music video. Doja Cat further went on to promote the single by appearing on Genius' show "Verified". In an interview with Elle in May 2022, she stated she regretted putting the song out, stating that her not being vocally and lyrically evolved makes the song "really difficult to listen to" for her.

A week before the album's release, "Candy", was released as the album's second single on March 23, 2018. Only a year later would the track become a sleeper hit after a dance challenge on the app TikTok went viral in late 2019. Consequently, the single charted in countries such as Australia, Canada and the United States, the latter having the song peak at 86 on the Billboard Hot 100 becoming her first solo entry on the chart.

The song "Mooo!" was originally released on August 10, 2018, exclusively to YouTube as a music video. The track would be the first of Doja's to become a viral phenomenon, and would eventually surpass over eighty million views on YouTube . The track was subsequently released commercially on streaming services, and would later serve as the first single off the deluxe edition of the album.

The second single from the deluxe edition (fourth overall), titled "Tia Tamera", featuring American rapper Rico Nasty, was released on February 20, 2019. A music video was released on the next day.

Critical reception 
Ranking it among their favorite albums of the first half of 2018, NPR described Amala as a "13-track collection of bubbly, hip-hop-influenced indie pop" and "manifesto of a young woman striving to take ownership of her craft, her image and her sexuality, mixing genres like dancehall, trap, house and R&B with a healthy dose of sass and humor."

Track listing
Credits adapted from Tidal.

Notes
  signifies a co-producer
  signifies an additional producer
 "Mooo!" contains portions of "Milkshake", as performed by Kelis from her 2003 album Tasty and "Move Bitch", as performed by Ludacris from his 2001 album Word of Mouf

Charts

Certifications

Notes

References 

2018 debut albums
Doja Cat albums
Kemosabe Records albums
Albums produced by Rogét Chahayed
Albums produced by Kurtis McKenzie
Albums produced by Dr. Luke
Indie pop albums by American artists